Giovan Battista Pigna (April 8, 1529November 4, 1575) was an Italian humanist, poet and historian from Ferrara. A reformer of the University of Ferrara, Pigna was secretary to Alfonso II d'Este, Duke of Ferrara and court historian at Ferrara.

Pigna's I romanzi (1554) argued that chivalric romances like those of Ariosto were a modern form of poetry equal to those considered by Aristotle's Poetics. Torquato Tasso, who succeeded Pigna as court historian, attacked Pigna's defence of Ariostan poetry in his Discorsi dell'arte poetica.

Works

 I romanzi di M. Giouan Battita Pigna ... divisi in tre libri. Ne quali della poesia, & della vita dell'Ariosto con nuouo modo si tratta , 1554 
 (ed.) Poetica Horatiana, 1561
 
 
 Historia de principi di Este, 1570

References

Bibliography 

 Girolamo Tiraboschi, Biblioteca modenese, IV, Modena 1783, p. 131;
 Lorenzo Barotti, Memorie istoriche di letterati ferraresi, II, Ferrara 1793, p. 177;
 Venceslao Santi, La precedenza fra gli Estensi e i Medici e l'istoria de' Principi d'Este di G. Battista Pigna, in Atti della Deputazione ferrarese di storia patria, IX (1897), p. 35 ff.;
 Luigi Raffaele, I codici delle rime di Giambattista Pigna, ibid., XXI (1912), p. 35 ff.;
 Giulio Bertoni, Torquato Tasso e Lucrezia Bendidio, in Poeti e poesie del Medioevo e del Rinascimento, Modena 1922, p. 273 ff.

links 
 

1530 births
1575 deaths
Italian Renaissance humanists
16th-century Italian poets
16th-century male writers
16th-century Italian  historians
16th-century scholars
Writers from Ferrara